Magnetic resonance spectroscopic imaging (MRSI) is a noninvasive imaging method that provides spectroscopic information in addition to the image that is generated by MRI alone. 

Whereas traditional magnetic resonance imaging (MRI) generates a black-and-white image in which brightness is determined primarily by the T1 or T2 relaxation times of the tissue being imaged, the spectroscopic information obtained in an MRSI study can be used to infer further information about cellular activity (metabolic information). For example, in the context of oncology, an MRI scan may reveal the shape and size of a tumor, while an MRSI study provides additional information about the metabolic activity occurring in the tumor. MRSI can be performed on a standard MRI scanner, and the patient experience is the same for MRSI as for MRI. MRSI has broad applications in medicine, including oncology and general physiological studies.

When hydrogen is the target element, MRSI is also called 1H-nuclear magnetic resonance spectroscopic imaging and proton magnetic resonance spectroscopic imaging. MRSI can also be performed with phosphorus, or  hyperpolarized carbon-13.

References

Magnetic resonance spectroscopic imaging entry in the public domain NCI Dictionary of Cancer Terms

External links 

Magnetic resonance imaging